Wallace Copeland Philoon (October 13, 1883 – January 16, 1970) was an American football player and a major general in the United States Army.

Biography
A native of Auburn, Maine, Philoon attended Bowdoin College, where he played college football and graduated in 1905.  He then enrolled in the United States Military Academy, playing at the center position for the Army Black Knights football team.  He was selected in 1908 as a first-team All-American by the Washington Herald (selected by William Peel), the Chicago Inter-Ocean and Fred Crolius.  He was also named a second-team All-American by Walter Camp.

After graduating from the United States Military Academy in 1909, alongside future general officers such as George S. Patton, William Hood Simpson, Jacob L. Devers and Robert L. Eichelberger, Philoon served as an officer in the United States Army. From 1942 to 1944, Philoon commanded the Army's training center at Fort McClellan, Alabama, where 200,000 infantry replacement troops were trained for World War II.

Head coaching record

References

External links

Generals of World War II

1883 births
1970 deaths
American football centers
Army Black Knights football players
Bowdoin Polar Bears football players
Montana Grizzlies football coaches
United States Army generals
United States Military Academy alumni
United States Army personnel of World War I
United States Army generals of World War II
Sportspeople from Auburn, Maine
Players of American football from Maine
Military personnel from Maine